Aleksander Osipovich Bernardazzi (alternative spelling: Alexandr Bernardacci) (July 2, 1831 – August 14, 1907) was a Russian (of Swiss Italian origin) architect best known for his work in Odesa and Chişinău.

His life 
Bernardazzi was born in Pyatigorsk in 1831. The town had been almost completely built by his father, and uncle, who were originally Swiss from Pambio. Very early Bernardazzi demonstrated artistic talent and was eventually sent to study in Moscow. His first architectural job was in Chişinău from 1856 to 1878, where he served as the city architect. In 1878 Bernardazzi moved to Odesa and lived there for over thirty years. In 1879 Bernardazzi became the Odesa city architect and in the mid-1880s he was appointed an architect at the Novaya Rossiya University in Odesa. It has been said that "the Odesa you see today is the work of this prodigious and talented architect".

Bernardazzi died August 14, 1907, in Fastiv. He was buried beside his mother in Chişinău.

Major work 

In the mid-1880s he designed:
 The former Odesa railway station, 1879–1883, destroyed by the Nazis in 1944;
 Disability house (later converted to a factory, "Pischepromavtomatika" (Пищепромавтоматика)), Mechnykova 53 (Мечникова), 1886;
 The Odesa International Technical Society building, Baranova 1 (Баранова), in 1887.

Bernardazzi designed a large number of residential buildings and mansions:

 Preobrazhenska 15 (1891);
 Pastera 34 (1891);
 Hoholaya 23;
 Troitska 20;
 Bazarna 20 (1893);
 Deribasivska 31, tobacco shop (1894);
 Didrihsona, 7, mansion (1894).

By the 100th Anniversary of Odesa, Odesa city architect Bernardazzi led the work of the Technical Division of the Architectural Society and instructed the design and construction of a number of public buildings. Bernardazzi most memorable designs were in the 1890s:

 Medical school clinic at Pastera 7 (Пастера);
 Belinsky 9 hospital (Белинского) (1892);
 Warehouse building near the railway station (1890s);
 Reformed Church Pastera 62 (Пастера),  the Puppet Theatre in Soviet period;
 Bristol Hotel at Pushkinskaya 15, 1898–1899;
 The New Stock Exchange, now the Odesa Philharmonic Theater (1894-1899).

Bernardazzi is also responsible for Baranova 18 (Баранова) (1902) and Troitska 18 (1903).

His other work includes:

 Porto-Franko Bank at Pushkinska 10
 A monument to Alexander II in Alexander Park. The statue was replaced and today only the base remains, used to honor Taras Shevchenko (Alexander Park has been renamed Shevchenko Park).
 St. Teodora de la Sihla Church
 Chişinău City Hall

See also 
 List of Russian architects

Notes 

1831 births
1907 deaths
People from Pyatigorsk
People from the Russian Empire of Italian descent
19th-century people from the Russian Empire
19th-century architects from the Russian Empire
Architects from the Russian Empire
People from the Russian Empire of Swiss descent
Architects from Odesa
Architects from Chișinău
Saint-Petersburg State University of Architecture and Civil Engineering alumni